Margarites keepi, common name the Keep margarite, is a species of sea snail, a marine gastropod mollusk in the family Margaritidae.

Description
The height of the shell attains 2 mm, its diameter 2.1 mm.

Distribution
This species occurs in the Pacific Ocean off California, USA.

References

  Smith & Gordon, The marine mollusks and brachiopods of Monterey Bay, California, and vicinity; Proceedings of the California Academy of Sciences 4th ser. v. 26 (1948)

External links
 To Biodiversity Heritage Library (1 publication)
 To Encyclopedia of Life
 To ITIS
 To World Register of Marine Species

keepi
Gastropods described in 1948